Consort Jeong may refer to:

Consorts with the surname Jeong
Imperial Consort Gwiin Jeong (1882–1943), concubine of Emperor Gojong of Korea

Consorts with the title Consort Jeong
Royal Consort Jeongbi Wang (died 1345), consort of Chungseon of Goryeo
Royal Consort Jeongbi An (died 1428), consort of Gongmin of Goryeo
Queen Wongyeong (1365–1420), wife of Taejong of Joseon

Women who received the title Consort Jeong after their deaths
Queen Jeongsuk, great-grandmother of Taejo of Joseon
Royal Consort Jeongbin Kim (died 1404), stepmother of Taejo of Joseon